Appanoose Township is a township in Franklin County, Kansas, USA.  As of the 2000 census, its population was 293.

Geography
According to the USGS, it contains one cemetery, Dean.

The stream of East Appanoose Creek runs through this township.

Education
Appanoose Township High School was consolidated with Pomona High School in 1962. The Appanoose High School colors were red and white with the Indian as their mascot.

References

External links
 City-Data.com
 USGS Geographic Names Information System (GNIS)

Townships in Franklin County, Kansas
Townships in Kansas